Equatorial Palm Oil plc (EPO) is a palm oil company from London, United Kingdom. It is listed on the Alternative Investment Market (AIM) of the
London Stock Exchange. Equatorial Palm Oil plc was founded in 2005.
Effective 20 December 2013, KL-Kepong International Ltd, a wholly owned unit of Kuala Lumpur Kepong Berhad acquired 63.181% interest in Equatorial Palm Oil PLC.
Major brands including Kellogg's, Kraft Foods, Nestlé, Unilever, Procter & Gamble, and General Mills have been reported as direct or indirect consumers of KLK palm oil.

Activity in Liberia
It has a concession in Grand Bassa, Rivercess and Sinoe Counties in Liberia of 169,000 hectares, including 1000 hectares of plantation land in 2010.
It holds interests in 34,398 hectares of land at Palm Bay area; 54,550 hectares of land at Butaw area; and 80,000 hectares of land in River Cess County.
Hectares of its plantation area in Liberia were set on fire in the course of a land dispute with locals. Some locals have accused the company of not putting people originating in the area into top jobs. Residents have often accused the district’s representative, Hon. Robertson Siawaye and others politicians of plotting against them and siding with the company to take away their land. Ellen Johnson Sirleaf said
that they can rest assure that there would be no further expansion by EPO.

EPO is accused of involvement in the arbitrary arrest and assault of Liberian community members who claim that they were resisting EPO's efforts to take their land.

In September 2013, officers from the EPO security team and the Liberian Police reportedly worked together to assault and beat Jogbahn community members who were peacefully protesting the company's operations.

On 13 January 2021, Equatorial Palm Oil PLC changed its name to Capital Metals PLC. The Company is now engaged in the exploration and development of mineral sands resources in Sri Lanka.

References

Food and drink companies of the United Kingdom
Palm oil production in Liberia
Palm oil production in Malaysia
Companies based in the City of Westminster
Food and drink companies established in 2005
2005 establishments in England
British companies established in 2005
Agriculture companies established in 2005